Haverford station is a SEPTA rapid transit station in Haverford Township, Pennsylvania. It serves the Norristown High Speed Line (Route 100) and is located at Haverford Road and Buck Lane. Local and express (but not limited) trains stop at Haverford. The station lies near the campus of Haverford College and the Haverford School. The station has off-street parking available.

Station layout

References

External links

Haverford Route 100 (The Subway Nut.com) 
 entrance in parking lot from Google Maps Street View

SEPTA Norristown High Speed Line stations
Railway stations in the United States opened in 1907